Emil Fredrik Fick (18 July 1863 – 20 February 1930) was Swedish fencer. He competed at the 1900 and 1906 Summer Olympics.

References

External links
 

1863 births
1930 deaths
Swedish male épée fencers
Swedish male foil fencers
Olympic fencers of Sweden
Fencers at the 1900 Summer Olympics
Fencers at the 1906 Intercalated Games
People from Landskrona Municipality
Sportspeople from Skåne County